Nahaufnahme (English: Closeup View) is the sixth studio album from Austrian singer Christina Stürmer. It was released by Universal on September 24, 2010 in German-speaking Europe. A commercial success, Nahaufnahme was certified platinum in Austria.

Track listing

Charts

Weekly charts

Year-end charts

Certifications

References

External links 
 

2010 albums
Christina Stürmer albums
German-language albums